"Mr. Ledbetter's Vacation" (sometimes rendered "Leadbetter") is a short story written by H. G. Wells in 1894. The story deals with the internal human conflict between rationality and the irrational fear of the unknown.

Publication
"Mr. Ledbetter's Vacation" was published in The Strand Magazine Vol. XVI: July - December 1898 (London: George Newnes Limited, 1898). That volume also contained an article on "The Boyhood of Lewis Carroll," recently deceased'; short stories by Sir Arthur Conan Doyle; "The Larrakin of Diamond Creek" by A. J. Raffles-author E. W. Hornung and stories/articles by W. W. Jacobs, L. T. Meade and others.

Plot summary
"Mr. Leadbetter is in holy orders, and for more years than he cares to remember has led a virtuous, worthwhile and very dull life. After drinking a little more than is good for him whilst on holiday, he rashly decides to commit a crime. It has consequences he could never have imagined - he ends up on the other side of the world."

Adaptations
Mr. Leadbetter's Vacation was adapted into a 30-minute BBC radio drama in the mid-1950s by Lance Sieveking. It was subsequently broadcast by NBC as part of their "Showcase" series, on 16 October 1954.

References

External links
 

1898 short stories
Crime short stories
Short stories by H. G. Wells
Works originally published in The Strand Magazine